Aberdeen is the county seat of Monroe County, Mississippi, United States. As of the 2010 census, the population was 5,612.

Located on the banks of the Tombigbee River, Aberdeen was one of the busiest Mississippi ports of the 19th century. Cotton was heavily traded in town, and for a time Aberdeen was Mississippi's second largest city. Aberdeen retains many historic structures from this period, with over 200 buildings on the National Register of Historic Places. In the spring of each year, Aberdeen hosts pilgrimages to its historic antebellum homes. The most prominent of these antebellum homes is The Magnolias, which was built in 1850.

Located just outside the city, Aberdeen Lock and Dam forms Aberdeen Lake, a popular recreational area. Aberdeen Lock and Dam is part of the Tennessee-Tombigbee waterway system.

History

In 1540, Hernando DeSoto's expedition was the first European expedition to travel through the vicinity of Aberdeen.

Aberdeen was first settled in 1834 and chartered as a town in 1837. In 1849, it became the county seat when Monroe County was formed.

On February 18, 1864, a skirmish occurred between the Union army and the Confederate army in Aberdeen. Lieutenant Colonel Burgh and the Ninth Illinois Cavalry came into contact with rebel militias, driving them back and taking possession of Aberdeen. The battle resulted in the company taking 18 prisoners of war, as well as the destruction of Confederate food supplies and machinery.

Hiram Revels, the first African-American United States Senator, died on January 16, 1901, while he was attending a church conference in Aberdeen.

Aberdeen had a population of 3,708 in 1910.  Its population had risen to 5,920 by 1950.  Its population was 7,184 in 1980.

Lynchings
In 1889, an African-American man, Keith Bowen was lynched by a mob after "he allegedly tried to enter a room where three white women were sitting."

In 1914, Mayho Miller, an 18-year-old Negro boy, was hanged by a mob after an alleged assault.

William Baker was an 18-year-old African-American man who was lynched in Aberdeen, Monroe County, Mississippi, by a white mob on March 8, 1922.

Geography
According to the United States Geological Survey, variant names are Dundee and New Aberdeen.

Variant names for East Aberdeen are Howards Bluff, Howards Farm, Howards Ferry, Howards Store, Martins Bluff, and Murffs.

Climate
The climate in this area is characterized by hot, humid summers and generally mild to cool winters.  According to the Köppen Climate Classification system, Aberdeen has a humid subtropical climate, abbreviated "Cfa" on climate maps.

Demographics

2020 census

As of the 2020 United States Census, there were 4,961 people, 2,016 households, and 1,195 families residing in the city.

2010 census
As of the 2010 United States Census, there were 5,612 people living in the city. 69.2% were African American, 28.8% White, 0.1% Native American, 0.2% Asian, 0.0% Pacific Islander, 0.6% from some other race and 1.0% of two or more races. 1.0% were Hispanic or Latino of any race.

2000 census
As of the census of 2000, there were 6,415 people, 2,398 households, and 1,661 families living in the city. The population density was 598.8 people per square mile (231.3/km). There were 2,730 housing units at an average density of 254.8 per square mile (98.4/km). The racial makeup of the city was 60.20% African American, 38.78% White, 0.09% Native American, 0.39% Asian, 0.05% Pacific Islander, 0.06% from other races, and 0.42% from two or more races. Hispanic or Latino of any race were 0.56% of the population.

There were 2,398 households, out of which 36.3% had children under the age of 18 living with them, 35.8% were married couples living together, 29.9% had a female householder with no husband present, and 30.7% were non-families. 27.6% of all households were made up of individuals, and 13.6% had someone living alone who was 65 years of age or older. The average household size was 2.58 and the average family size was 3.14.

In the city, the population was spread out, with 29.8% under the age of 18, 8.8% from 18 to 24, 25.7% from 25 to 44, 19.8% from 45 to 64, and 15.9% who were 65 years of age or older. The median age was 34 years. For every 100 females, there were 78.8 males. For every 100 females age 18 and over, there were 69.7 males.

The median income for a household in the city was $23,530, and the median income for a family was $27,611. Males had a median income of $27,857 versus $17,090 for females. The per capita income for the city was $11,584. About 26.3% of families and 29.6% of the population were below the poverty line, including 42.2% of those under age 18 and 26.7% of those age 65 or over.

Education
The City of Aberdeen is served by the Aberdeen School District.

Media

Radio stations
1240 WWZQ-AM
105.3 WACR-FM

Infrastructure

Highways
  U.S. Highway 45
  Mississippi Highway 8
  Mississippi Highway 25
  Mississippi Highway 145

Railroads
 Burlington Northern and Santa Fe Railway
 Alabama and Gulf Coast Railway
 Kansas City Southern Railway

Notable people

 Stephen Adams, member of United States House of Representatives and United States Senate
 Steve Baylark, running back for Sacramento Mountain Lions of United Football League
 Guy Bush ("the Mississippi Mudcat"), Major League Baseball pitcher who won 176 games and gave up Babe Ruth's last two career home runs
 Oliver Darden, basketball player for University of Michigan and in the American Basketball Association
 Reuben Davis, Congressman and Confederate general, resided at Reuben Davis House
 James Bell Dickson, U.S. Army Air Forces pilot
 John Gregg, Confederate general in Civil War
 Moses Hardy, formerly oldest living American man, one of the oldest veterans of World War I
 Fredrick McGhee, first black lawyer in Minnesota, prominent criminal defense attorney, civil rights leader, and co-founder, with W.E. B. DuBois, of the Niagara Movement.
 Eugene Sykes, Justice of Supreme Court of Mississippi, first chairman of Federal Communications Commission
 Jim Walden, football head coach at Washington State and Iowa State University
 Bukka White (Booker T. Washington White), blues musician

In popular culture
The city of Aberdeen is the subject of the HGTV show Hometown Renovation, where local makeup artist and designer Billy Brasfield sets to redesign and renovate some of the city's houses and landmarks.

The city is also the subject of a song by blues artist Bukka White, Aberdeen, Mississippi, later covered by guitarist Kenny Wayne Shepherd as Aberdeen.

See also
 Aberdeen Lake
 Aberdeen Lock and Dam
 Tennessee-Tombigbee Waterway

References

External links
 City of Aberdeen website
 Aberdeen Visitors Bureau

Cities in Mississippi
Cities in Monroe County, Mississippi
County seats in Mississippi
Populated places established in 1834
1834 establishments in Mississippi